Charles Gilman may refer to:

 Charles J. Gilman (1824–1901), U.S. Representative from Maine
 Charles A. Gilman (1833–1924), Minnesota legislator
 Charles W. Gilman (1862–1938), Wisconsin legislator

See also
Charles Gilman Norris, U.S. novelist